Zdenko Runjić (26 October 1942 – 27 October 2004) was a Croatian songwriter. In his long career, he established himself as one of the most prolific and most popular songwriters of former Yugoslavia and Croatia.

Biography
Runjić was born on 26 October 1942 in the village of Garčin near Slavonski Brod. Many of his songs were inspired by the folk traditions of Dalmatia. The songs became classics and Runjić helped the careers of many notable Croatian musicians such as Oliver Dragojević, Doris Dragović and Meri Cetinić. He was especially successful at the prestigious Split Music Festival. He wrote almost 700 songs which sold several million copies in both albums and singles. More than 200 songs were written for Dragojević alone. He was also a successful businessman and music producer. He owned a record company called Skalinada which became one of the most prominent record companies of Croatia.

In 1993, following the dispute with the Split Music Festival organisers, he founded the rival music festival called Melodije Hrvatskog Jadrana (Melodies of the Croatian Adriatic) and it soon became the key music festival of the country. On 27 October 2004, Runjić died in Krapinske Toplice from a stroke while recovering from a heart attack.

See also
Croatian music

References

External links
Discography of Zdenko Runjić
Some audio clips

Croatian songwriters
1942 births
2004 deaths
People from Slavonski Brod
Musicians from Split, Croatia
Burials at Lovrinac Cemetery